Books Across the Sea was a cultural and literary movement begun in 1940 as the result of the stopping of the transatlantic trade in printed books. At that time there was a ban on the import and export of non-essential goods into Britain to free-up shipping space for more essential goods.

Books Across the Sea was founded in 1940 by Beatrice Warde to help offset Nazi propaganda among other expatriate Americans remaining in London after the fall of France. She arranged through her mother May Lamberton Becker, literary editor of the New York Herald Tribune for single copies of 70 new significant American titles to be imported in friends' hand luggage. These were displayed in the offices of the Americans in Britain Outpost of the Committee to Defend America by Aiding the Allies. A similar present of British-published books was sent to America. The books were carefully selected to mirror life in the two countries and included educational titles. Schools assembled and sent scrap books showing the daily life of the children. 

It was quickly seen that books were essential good-will ambassadors, and a formal organisation was set up to run it, with branches in Britain (in London and Edinburgh) and America (in New York and Boston), first under the chairmanship of Professor Arthur Newall, and soon after by T. S. Eliot. By 1944 some 2,000 volumes had been received in London and 1,600 in New York. The branches also acted as enquiry centres about life in the opposite countries. After the war, in  February 1946, the London collection of books was presented to the South Audley Street branch of the City of Westminster Libraries at a ceremony attended by Mrs Eleanor Roosevelt.

Books Across the Sea was formally adopted by the English-Speaking Union in 1947 which still runs it, widening the scope to cover other countries.

References

Beatrice Warde, "Books Across the Sea; Ambassadors of good will", in The Times 2 January 1942, p 5: Issue 49123; col F. Letter about the scheme.

Beatrice Warde, Anglo-American Links", in The Times 23 October, 1944; p 5; Issue 49979/2; col E. Letter about the school scrap books.

"Books Across the Sea: Mrs Roosevelt on a valuable tie", in The Times 1 February 1946; p 7; Issue 50365; pol D. Report of the gift of the books to Westminster Libraries.

Professor Arthur Newell, "Mrs Beatrice Warde", in The Times 25 September, 1969' p 12; Issue 57674; col G. Obituary notice, deals with her work with Books Across the Sea.

English Speaking Union page about Books Across the Sea  Note: The historical information here is not accurate.

Archives 
Archive materials related to Books Across the Sea are held in multiple collections. Papers related to the movement, as well as Beatrice Warde's personal and professional papers, are held at the Cadbury Research Library, University of Birmingham. A large collection of books that were exchanged as part of the programme are held at the University of Kent. Other correspondence related to Books Across the Sea is held at the University of Reading.

References

United Kingdom home front during World War II
Literary societies